The Citizen may refer to:

U.S. newspapers 
 The Citizen (Auburn), the daily newspaper for Auburn, New York
 Citizen (Chicago newspaper), a Chicago newspaper group also producing the Ravenswood Citizen, North Side Citizen, and Uptown Citizen at various times from 1910 to 1930 often referred to locally as The Citizen
 Cushing Citizen, a daily newspaper in Cushing, Oklahoma often referred to locally as The Citizen
 The Citizen (Georgia), a weekly newspaper for Fayette County, Georgia
 The Citizen (Kansas City), a regional monthly newspaper in the Kansas City Metropolitan Area
 The Citizen (Laconia), a broadsheet published in Laconia, New Hampshire
 Foster's Sunday Citizen, the Sunday version of the Laconia paper, published with Foster's Daily Democrat of Dover, New Hampshire
 The Citizen (Vermont), a weekly newspaper for Charlotte and Hinesburg, Vermont
 The Key West Citizen, the daily newspaper for Key West, Florida

Non-U.S. newspapers 
 The Citizen (Blackburn), a local newspaper in Blackburn, England
 The Citizen (Gloucester) is a daily newspaper for Gloucester, England
 The Citizen (Lynn), a local newspaper in King's Lynn, England
 The Ottawa Citizen, a newspaper in Canada's capital known locally as "The Citizen"
 The Citizen (Russia), Russian name Grazhdanin, a Russian conservative political and literary magazine/newspaper published in St. Petersburg, Russia
 The Citizen (South Africa), a national English language tabloid
 The Citizen (South Sudan), the largest newspaper in the country
 The Citizen (Tanzania), Tanzania's leading English language newspaper

Other uses
 The Citizen (play), a 1761 play by Arthur Murphy
 The Citizen (film), a 2012 film
 The Citizen (character), a character in Ulysses
 "The Citizens" is a commonly used nickname for Manchester City F.C.
 "The Citizens" is the former nickname of Norwich City F.C.

See also 
 The Daily Citizen (disambiguation)
 Citizen (disambiguation)